HMS Racoon, sometimes spelled HMS Raccoon, was an  torpedo cruiser of the Royal Navy.  Racoon was laid down on 1 February 1886 and came into service on 1 March 1888.   She served on the East Indies Station  where, on 27 August 1896, she was involved in the bombardment of Sultan Khalid's palace during the 40 minute Anglo–Zanzibar War.

In early May 1901 Racoon returned to the United Kingdom,  and was paid off at Sheerness on 6 July 1901.

She was decommissioned on 1 January 1905 and sold for scrap.

References

Bibliography

External links
 

 

1887 ships
Ships built in Plymouth, Devon
Archer-class cruisers
Victorian-era naval ships of the United Kingdom